Jacobus Christoffel Entienne Swanepoel (born 9 March 1993) is a South African born Italian rugby union player for Italian Top12 side Rugby Rovigo Delta. His regular position is tighthead prop.

Club career

Western Province

Swanepoel was born in Sasolburg, but grew up in Cape Town. He was selected to represent  at the premier high schools rugby union tournament in South Africa, the Under-18 Craven Week, held in Kimberley in 2011.

After high school, he joined the Western Province Academy and made seven appearances for their Under-19 team in the 2012 Under-19 Provincial Championship. However, he missed out on the title play-offs, which saw his side crowned champions by beating the  team 22–18 in Durban.

He made nine appearances for their Under-21 team that finished top of the 2013 Under-21 Provincial Championship to qualify for the semi-finals. This time, Swanepoel did play in the play-off matches, starting their 44–41 victory over the Golden Lions in the semi-final and their 30–23 victory over the Blue Bulls in the final.

At the start of the following year, Swanepoel was included in the  squad for the 2014 Vodacom Cup. He made his first class debut in their opening match of the competition against near-neighbours  in a 16–8 victory. He made a further four starts during the regular season, helping Western Province to finish in fourth position in the Southern Section. He also started in their quarter final match, where a 13–8 defeat to the  ended their interest in the competition. He started in Western Province U21s' opening match of the 2014 Under-21 Provincial Championship, but suffered a knee injury that ruled him out of the remainder of 2014.

He was named in their senior squad for the 2015 Currie Cup Premier Division, but failed to make any appearances.

Blue Bulls

In August 2015, the  announced that they secured Swanepoel's services until October 2017. He made his debut for them in the 2016 Currie Cup qualification series by starting in their 16–30 defeat to his former side, Western Province, making a total of ten appearances in the competition. He was then named in their squad for the 2016 Currie Cup Premier Division.

Stade Français

Swanepoel joined French Top 14 side Stade Français at the start of 2017.

Southern Kings

Valsugana, Petrarca, Rovigo

In July 2018, Italian side Valsugana announced that Swanepoel would join them for their inaugural season in the Top12 following promotion from Serie A. The following season, Swanepoel signed a one-year contract with the other team from Padova, Petrarca. After the premature cancellation of the championship amidst the COVID-19 emergency, on April 30, 2020 he was subsequently drafted by Rugby Rovigo Delta for the incoming season

International career
On the 14 October 2021, he was selected by Alessandro Troncon to be part of an Italy A 28-man squad and on 16 December was named in Emerging Italy squad for the 2021 end-of-year rugby union internationals.

References

1993 births
Living people
People from Sasolburg
Afrikaner people
South African rugby union players
Rugby union props
Blue Bulls players
Boland Cavaliers players
Western Province (rugby union) players
Southern Kings players
Rugby union players from the Free State (province)